Coleosporium tussilaginis is a species of rust fungus in the family Coleosporiaceae. It is a plant pathogen.

It is known to infect Campanula rotundifolia, on which it produces urediniospores and teliospores.

References

Fungal plant pathogens and diseases
Pucciniales
Fungi described in 1801
Taxa named by Christiaan Hendrik Persoon